The NZ Climate Party was an unregistered political party in New Zealand. The party was focused on highlighting and addressing the threat of climate change. The party launched in August 2014, and was led by Peter Whitmore.

The party did not register to contest the party vote in the 2014 election, but stood two electorate candidates, in Auckland Central and Rongotai. A representative from the party, Aaron Carter, attended a candidates meeting in Newtown, Wellington dressed in an elephant costume and bearing a sign which said "climate change". His main messages were: "Don't vote for me, vote thinking about the climate", "It's all rearranging furniture on the Titanic as it's sinking", and "Learn to swim". Whitmore and Carter received 50 and 66 electoral votes respectively.

Climate Party member Rob Painting contested the 2015 Northland by-election with the stated goal of "raising awareness of climate and coastal issues affecting the Far North". He received 39 votes (0.13% of votes cast).

The party opposed the New Zealand Emissions Trading Scheme, arguing that it did nothing to stop New Zealand's emissions from increasing.

The party did not run any candidates in the 2017 election.

See also

Climate change in New Zealand

References

External links
 

Green political parties in New Zealand
Political parties established in 2014
2014 establishments in New Zealand
Climate change in New Zealand
Single-issue political parties in New Zealand